Professional qualifications in the United Kingdom are titles or awards granted by professional bodies. Many British professional qualifications were subject to the European directives on professional qualifications and are (following Brexit) covered by amended versions of those regulations as enacted in British law. Most, but not all, professional qualifications are 'Chartered' qualifications, and follow on from having been admitted to a degree (or having an equivalent qualification). The term "professional qualification" can also be used to refer to higher-level vocational qualifications in "professional" roles.

Regulation and levels
There are four forms of regulated profession in the UK, with respect to the European directives on professional qualifications: professions regulated by law or public authority; professions regulated by professional bodies incorporated by royal charter; professions regulated under Regulation 35; and the seven sectoral professions with harmonised training requirements across the European Union. The European directives are given force of law in the UK via regulations issued by the Secretary of State under the European Communities Act 1972; the most recent regulations are The European Union (Recognition of Professional Qualifications) Regulations 2015.

The Gatsby Charitable Foundation has been supporting the development of professional qualifications for technicians, such as the Science Council's Registered Science Technician (RSciTech), the Engineering Council's Engineering Technician (EngTech) and ICT Technician (ICTTech), and the British Computer Society's Registered IT Technician (RITTech). Analysis by the Foundation identifies three levels of professional qualification on a "registration ladder" in science and engineering: technician registration, requiring Advanced Apprenticeships, A Levels, BTEC nationals, or similar awards at levels 3–4 on the Qualifications and Credit Framework (now replaced by the Regulated Qualifications Framework); intermediate qualifications such as Incorporated Engineer (IEng) and Registered Scientist (RSci) requiring Higher Apprenticeships, Higher National Diplomas, foundation degrees, bachelor's degrees, or similar awards at levels 5–6; and chartered statuses such as CEng, CSci, CPhys, CChem, etc. that require master's degrees or similar qualifications at level 7 or above.

The European directives specify five levels of professional qualification in the general system, labelled a to e and approximately defined by their required academic training as:
 
On this scale, ICTTech, EngTech and other technician qualifications equate to level c, IEng equates to level d, and CEng, CSci, etc. elite to level e. Although chartered statuses in science and engineering are placed at level e, in some fields chartered statuses, while remaining terminal professional qualifications in that field, are at level d (e.g. CMgr).

Professional qualifications requiring an attestation of competence

These professions are government regulated and involve reserved activities rather than a reserved title. Some of these are devolved matters that are not uniformly regulated across the UK. In most cases, the competent authority for these is a government department or agency.

Professional qualifications requiring education at secondary level

These professional qualifications are mostly, as in the previous category, government regulated with reserved activities, although some are through licensing of use of a reserved title.

Professions with reserved activities:

Professions with protected titles under a licensing system:

Professional qualifications requiring education for at least one year at post-secondary level
These qualifications now begin to include those which have protected titles without reserve of activities, normally granted by professional bodies under their royal charter rather than by statutory or regulatory bodies. Titles granted by professional bodies are often accompanied by postnominal letters.

Regulated by law or public authority

Professions with reserved activities or protected functions:

Professions with protected titles under a licensing system:

Professions with protected titles without reserve of activities:

Regulated by professional bodies under royal charter

Professions with protected titles without reserve of activities:

Professional qualifications requiring bachelor's degree level education

Many of these are protected titles without reserve of activities, regulated by professional bodies acting under a royal charter. This includes a large number of chartered statuses, which are terminal professional qualifications in that field.

Regulated by law or public authority

Professions with reserved activities:

Professions with reserved activities and protected titles:

Professions with protected titles under a licensing system:

Professions with protected titles without reserve of activities:

Regulated by professional bodies under royal charter

Professions with reserved activities and protected titles:

Professions with protected titles without reserve of activities:

Professional qualifications requiring master's degree level education

Regulated by law or public authority

Professions with reserved activities and protected titles:

Professions with protected titles without reserve of activities:

Regulated by professional bodies under royal charter

Professions with reserved activities:

Professions with protected titles without reserve of activities:

Professional qualifications for which the level of education is not applicable

Regulated by law or public authority

Professions with reserved activities:

Regulated by professional bodies under royal charter

Professions with reserved activities:

Professions with protected titles without reserve of activities:

Professional qualifications in sectoral professions

The "sectoral professions" are ones which are regulated in every EU country and where training and education requirements have been harmonised. There is therefore no explicit training level associated with the qualifications in the regulations as the educational requirements do not vary between countries and do not need to be compared. All of these are regulated by law or public authority, not by professional bodies.

Professional qualifications not included in the European directives

Not all chartered titles are included in the European directives on professional qualifications, but all UK chartered titles, and some lower-level titles, are issued by a professional body under the authority of a royal charter and are thus recognised professional qualifications (these should not be confused with membership levels within an organisation). These qualifications are sometimes associated with professions that are included in the directives as regulated under law or by public authority (e.g. architecture or psychology).

Non-chartered titles:

Chartered titles:

References

Economy of the United Kingdom
United Kingdom-related lists
Professional titles and certifications